Acacia lineata A.Cunn. ex G.Don, commonly known as streaked wattle or narrow lined-leaved wattle, occurs naturally inland eastern Australia. The genus Acacia is the largest genus of flowering plants in Australia, containing around 1000 species throughout a diverse range of environments from coast to desert.

The word Acacia is thought to have been derived from a Greek word for sharpen, and lineata from a Latin word meaning marked by fine parallel lines.

Currently A. lineata is not considered rare or endangered. It occurs in Queensland, New South Wales, South Australia and Victoria where it is considered as uncommon.

Description 
Acacia lineata grows into a bushy, low spreading shrub 0.5-2m high and 1-2.5m wide. Branchlets are round, hairy and resinous. It is a perennial.

As is common in many Acacias, the leaves of A. lineata are not true leaves, but a modified leaf stem known as a phyllode. The phyllodes of A. lineata are dark green, sparsely to densely hairy, often sticky, slightly clustered, tough and erect; ending in a small point 0.7-2.5 cm long to 1-3mm wide. Margins are thick, there is a visible vein running lengthwise and a small gland near the base.

The inflorescence is a bright yellow ball 4-6mm in diameter, containing 10-16 flowers on a slim stalk 2.5-10mm long (singly or in pairs), growing out from the base of the phyllodes.

The seed pod or legumes are curved and can be flat or twisted, 2–6 cm long and 2-4mm wide, turning from green to a dark brown when mature and papery in texture. They are slightly hairy and sticky.

Seeds are greyish/black, 3 to 5mm long, oblong shaped and spaced length-ways within the legume; with flattened sections separated each seed from another. The seed-terminal is short, folded and widens into a pale aril.

Taxonomy 
A. lineata belongs to the Family Fabaceae also called the legume or pea family, in the Clade Mimosoidae.
The following species are considered conspecific with A. lineata; A. imbricata, A. flexifolia, A. runciformis and A. dasyphylla.

Distribution and Habitat 
A. lineata has a sporadic distribution. It occurs in central to western New South Wales. It has been noted to grow around the Killara Road area of the Narrandera Rangers, and throughout the mallee areas north-east of Barellan.

It also known to occur in south-east Queensland, north-west Mallee areas of Victoria and can be seen in south-east South Australia; with known locations including the Yorke Peninsula region and Murray region.

A. lineata grows in a variety of habitats such as sclerophyll forest and woodland, but mostly occurs in mallee communities.

Ecology 
A. lineata can grow in alkaline, sandy, or gravely soils.

Having phyllodes instead of leaves help A. lineate to survive in dry semi-arid environments, by reducing water loss. The phyllodes of A. lineatea are small, point up and are slightly hairy; adaptations that further reduce water loss.

Acacias are able to fix nitrogen in the soil via a host bacteria that live on the roots called rhizobia, which aids in the growth of other plant species.

Reproduction and Dispersal 
A. lineata flowers appear from July to October depending on the region, with seeds maturing over summer.

The pale aril of the A. lineata seeds, suggests dispersal by ants.

Cultivation and Uses 
A. lineata is planted as an ornamental shrub in parks and along roadsides. It prefers temperate regions, is moderately drought and frost tolerant, and will grow from a seed or cutting. Acacias are a good source of pollen; sheltered nesting habitat for birds and seeds which are eaten by birds.

Indigenous Australians use many species of Acacia for a diverse range of purposes. Seeds and roots are a good source of food. Wood is used for fire, tools, shelters etc. Acacias provide habitat which attracts other foods (birds, kangaroos) and they are also used as a seasonal indicator.

References

lineata
Flora of New South Wales
Flora of Queensland
Flora of Victoria (Australia)
Fabales of Australia